The Supreme Court of Canada is the court of last resort and final appeal in Canada. Cases that are successfully appealed to the Court are generally of national importance. Once a case is decided the Court will publish written reasons for the decision that consist of one or more reasons from any number of the nine justices. Understanding the background of the cases, their reasons and the authorship can be important and insightful as each judge may have varying beliefs in legal theory and understanding.

List of cases by Court era
 List of Supreme Court of Canada cases (Richards Court through Fauteux Court): This list includes cases from the formation of the Court on April 8, 1875, through to the retirement of Gérald Fauteux on December 23, 1973.
 List of Supreme Court of Canada cases (Laskin Court): This list includes cases from the rise of Bora Laskin through to his death on March 26, 1984.
 List of Supreme Court of Canada cases (Dickson Court): This list includes cases from the rise of Brian Dickson through to his retirement on June 30, 1990.
 List of Supreme Court of Canada cases (Lamer Court): This list includes cases from the elevation to Chief Justice of Antonio Lamer on July 1, 1990, to his retirement on January 6, 2000.
 List of Supreme Court of Canada cases (McLachlin Court): This list includes cases from the elevation to Chief Justice of Beverley McLachlin on January 12, 2000, to her retirement on December 15, 2017.
 List of Supreme Court of Canada cases (Wagner Court) This list includes cases from the elevation to Chief Justice of Richard Wagner on December 18, 2017, to the present.

List of reasons by author

List of reasons given by year

 1984 reasons of the Supreme Court of Canada
 1985 reasons of the Supreme Court of Canada
 1986 reasons of the Supreme Court of Canada
 1987 reasons of the Supreme Court of Canada
 1988 reasons of the Supreme Court of Canada
 1989 reasons of the Supreme Court of Canada
 1990 reasons of the Supreme Court of Canada
 1991 reasons of the Supreme Court of Canada
 1992 reasons of the Supreme Court of Canada
 1993 reasons of the Supreme Court of Canada
 1994 reasons of the Supreme Court of Canada
 1995 reasons of the Supreme Court of Canada
 1996 reasons of the Supreme Court of Canada
 1997 reasons of the Supreme Court of Canada
 1998 reasons of the Supreme Court of Canada
 1999 reasons of the Supreme Court of Canada
 2000 reasons of the Supreme Court of Canada
 2001 reasons of the Supreme Court of Canada
 2002 reasons of the Supreme Court of Canada
 2003 reasons of the Supreme Court of Canada
 2004 reasons of the Supreme Court of Canada
 2005 reasons of the Supreme Court of Canada
 2006 reasons of the Supreme Court of Canada
 2007 reasons of the Supreme Court of Canada
 2008 reasons of the Supreme Court of Canada
 2009 reasons of the Supreme Court of Canada
 2010 reasons of the Supreme Court of Canada
 2011 reasons of the Supreme Court of Canada
 2012 reasons of the Supreme Court of Canada
 2013 reasons of the Supreme Court of Canada
 2014 reasons of the Supreme Court of Canada
 2015 reasons of the Supreme Court of Canada
 2016 reasons of the Supreme Court of Canada
 2017 reasons of the Supreme Court of Canada
 2018 reasons of the Supreme Court of Canada
 2019 reasons of the Supreme Court of Canada
 2020 reasons of the Supreme Court of Canada
 2021 reasons of the Supreme Court of Canada
 2022 reasons of the Supreme Court of Canada

See also 
 List of Judicial Committee of the Privy Council cases originating in Canada
 List of notable Canadian Courts of Appeals cases
 List of notable Canadian lower court cases
 List of Vancouver court cases

External links 
 Summaries
 entire Judgments
 Ten most cited cases

 
Supreme